Peter McGarr (born 28 May 1953) is an English classical composer and teacher, working in the English experimental tradition and inspired by Northern English landscape and culture.

Biography
McGarr was born in Openshaw, Manchester, and attended Ducie Technical High School for Boys, now Manchester Academy. He studied Music and Dance at Mather College (now part of Manchester University) and is self-taught in composition. For several years he taught steel pan, achieving the Outstanding Performance Award from Music for Youth for his steel band 'Orchestral Steel', appearing in the School Proms at the Royal Albert Hall in 1984 and 1986. He has received the Butterworth Prize for Composition from the Society for the Promotion of New Music and has been nominated for Music Teacher of the Year, the British Composer Awards, the Paul Hamlyn foundation Awards and the Civitella Ranieri Foundation Fellowship. He has led composition workshops at the Edinburgh International Festival and also engaged extensively with musical activities involving the elderly and people with dementia.

Style and influences
McGarr has been influenced by the sounds and changing culture of the Northern English people and landscape. His music inhabits a world of seasonal rituals, regional myth and historical-personal memories. He uses theatre, extended techniques and everyday sounds to 'Sustain rapt melody that seems to scrutinise the tintinnabulations of nature for signs of hope or doom'. His musical style 'Integrates tremolo sounds into a subtle patchwork of changing harmonies.' He follows in a long tradition of British artists and poets who have interpreted the British people and landscape.

Works and commissions
He has received performances and commissions from many leading musicians, orchestras and festivals including the BBC Proms at the Royal Albert Hall, BBC Philharmonic, London Sinfonietta (Conductor Pierre Andre Valade), Joanna MacGregor, Ensemble Bash, Three Strange Angels, Passacaglia, oboeworks, Cappella Nova, The Crossing (USA),
Tempest Flute Trio, Kevin Bowyer, Ruth Morley, Emily Andrews, Sarah Field, Brodsky Quartet, Tubalate,. 

He was commissioned by the Tallis Festival to write a 40-part companion piece to Thomas Tallis's Spem in alium. The resulting work, Lindisfarne Love Song (also called Love You Big as the Sky) included poems about Lindisfarne, diary notes and the detailed geography of the area including shipwrecks and lighthouses. An on-line campaign has since started, Lybats, to secure a performance of the piece on its "spiritual home" of Lindisfarne.

The Bath International Music Festival commissioned its largest ever piece; a choral work from McGarr, to celebrate the festival's 60th anniversary. The work was Homesongs and scored for over a 1,000 voices.

Recent projects include a video piece for Ensemble Bash, 'The Acoustics of Morecambe Bay.

His music is published by Faber Music.

British Composer Awards
He won the 2013–14 British Composer Awards (Making Music Category) for his piece Dry Stone Walls of Yorkshire, written for orchestra with soundtrack and features field recordings made on Saddleworth Moor.

Selected works
The Acoustics of Morecambe Bay for Percussion Quartet
Creating a Wildflower Garden (Wildflower Street) for orchestra
Dreaming England for mixed choir
Lindisfarne Love Song (Love You Big as the Sky) for 40-part choir
Sweet Steel Alone for solo tenor steel pan
Tidelines for Javanese gamelan
Night Scented Stock for percussion and piano
Audlem Sonatas for solo percussion
Sound Asleep for percussion quartet
Vanishing Games for oboe quartet
The Buried Dreams of Our Lives for baroque ensemble
Something Lost for flute and piano
Eleven Nights with Glenn Gould for solo piano

Selected recordings
Something Lost (Sarah Brooke, flute; Elizabeth Burley, piano / British Music Label BML031)
Dreaming England / Beautiful Days (Exmoor Singers of London: conductor James Jarvis)
Vanishing Games (Oboe Quartet: oboeworks. / Dinmore Records DRD 066)
Fieldthread (Flutes d'Accordes / Amalie Records ALACD 1202)
Memory Trace (Tuba Quartet; Tubalate / TCD 5)
Homesongs (Collected soundtracks / Broken Scissor Records BSR 01457)
Sound Asleep (Ensemble Bash / SignumSIGCD 294)

References

External links
 Peter McGarr, Website
 Points North (excerpt) - Peter Mcgarr Clip of 'Points-North' for three flutes

1953 births
English composers
Living people
Musicians from Manchester
People educated at Ducie Technical High School for Boys